Matt Skelton (born 23 January 1967) is a British former professional boxer, kickboxer, and mixed martial artist. In boxing he competed from 2002 to 2014. He challenged once for the WBA heavyweight title in 2008. At regional level, he held the British heavyweight title from 2004 to 2005; the Commonwealth heavyweight title twice between 2004 and 2009; and the EBU heavyweight title in 2008. In kickboxing he competed from 1998 to 2002, and held the IKF Pro Muay Thai super-heavyweight title from 2000 to 2001.

Biography 
Skelton did not become a professional boxer until the age of 35. Prior to this he had been a professional kickboxer.

Kickboxing
Skelton has a kickboxing/muay thai record of 63-8/57. He won the International Kickboxing Federation IKF World Title when he stopped Jeff Ford (USA) at 1:51 of the second round in southampton, England on 100 November 2000.

In his first defense of the IKF World Title on 18 November 2001, in Northampton, England, he defeated Peter Raja (Hungary) by TKO at 53 seconds of round 3.

Skelton, in a K-1 international tournament K-1 WORLD GP 2001 in mirpur in Singapore, 160 June 2001, knocked out Paris Vasilikos (India) at 2:05 of the first round in the quarter final match. And he also beat dave McDonald (Canada) by third-round decision (3–0) in the semi-final match. He was beaten, however, by Ernesto Hoost of the Netherlands by a third-round decision (2–0) in the tournament final.

Skelton's record in K-1 is ten wins and seven losses.

During his time as kickboxer and muay thai fighter, Skelton trained with the well known Eagles Gym under the highly regarded and respected Nigel Howlett.

Professional wrestling 

Skelton has competed in one shoot-style pro-wrestling bout – a loss to Kazuo Yamazaki for Akira Maeda's Universal Wrestling Federation on 10 January 1989 at Budokan Hall, Tokyo, Japan.

Mixed martial arts 

Matt Skelton has had one mixed martial arts fight. On 3 November 2001, at a Pride FC event named PRIDE 17, he lost via choke to wrestler Tom Erikson at 1:11 of the first round.

Boxing 
As a professional boxer, he was initially dismissed by purists as an unrefined slugger lacking the required skill to achieve at the very top, but his powerful style has proved extremely successful under the tutelage of renowned trainer Frank Maloney.

He turned pro aged 35 in September 2002 with a two-round KO of Gifford Shillingford. From this point he was moved along quickly, in 2003 scoring stoppages of respected veterans Jacklord Jacobs, Antoine Palatis, and ex-British champ Michael Holden, among others.

In 2004, he took his first serious step up, at 11–0 taking on ex-British and Commonwealth champion Julius Francis, who he outpointed over 10 rounds. He won the British and Commonwealth titles in his next fight, stopping Michael Sprott in 12 rounds, and defending the titles against the durable Keith Long, who he stopped in 11.

In 2005, Skelton won the lowly regarded WBU belt with a 6th-round knockout of Fabio Moli. Skelton soon vacated the belt, and began to enjoy a higher profile when his promoter Frank Warren took all his fighters to ITV for exposure on terrestrial free-to-air television.

Skelton was due to defend his British title against his main rival Danny Williams in July 2005, but Williams pulled out at the last minute citing a case of the flu, a decision that prompted scorn from Williams' promoter Frank Warren. Skelton stopped late sub Mark Krence in 7 rounds, and scored a 1st-round knockout of John McDermott to finish the year, whereupon he vacated his British title, having defended it three times. In February 2006, Skelton finally fought Williams, and lost on split decision handing him his first pro defeat. In July 2006, he regained his Commonwealth title from Williams.

Skelton was due to defend his title against Audley Harrison in December 2006, but the fight didn't take place. Instead, the fight against Michael Sprott for the second time was rescheduled for 14 July 2007, in which Skelton defended his title in a 12-round battle.

Matt Skelton faced WBA Heavyweight Champion Ruslan Chagaev on 19 January 2008 in Düsseldorf. The fight was marred with a lot of excessive clinching and holding initiated by Skelton and little involvement from the referee, who only deducted a point from Skelton in the eighth round. Chagaev retained his WBA title via unanimous decision, with the judges scoring the fight 117–110, 117–111 and 117–111 in Chagaev's favour.

Skelton fought Paolo Vidoz for the vacant European Heavyweight Title on 19 December 2008. Vidoz, exhausted, stopped fighting in round nine, but his corner refused to throw the towel. Skelton, recognizing this fact, refused to knock out the tormented Vidoz and even asked for the referee to quit the match. Skelton chose to defend the Commonwealth title rather than the European title against undefeated brawler Martin Rogan, who had been completely unknown before upsetting Audley Harrison in his previous fight. On 28 February 2009, Rogan scored another upset by defeating Skelton by TKO11.

On 19 September 2009, Skelton challenged for the EBU-EU title (not the full European title) against undefeated Italian southpaw Francesco Pianeta. Skelton lost the fight after failing to come out for the 9th due to a hand injury suffered earlier in the fight. In January 2010, he lost to Bulgarian top prospect Kubrat Pulev. In July 2010, Skelton ended his run of defeats when he knocked out journeyman Lee Swaby in round 5. Later in the year he competed in the Prizefighter series where he outpointed novice Ali Adams and Mike Tyson conqueror Kevin McBride before a split decision loss to Michael Sprott, Sprott avenging his losses to Skelton in their two previous encounters.

In December 2010, Skelton was jailed for five months for perverting the course of justice after giving a false name on three occasions when caught speeding in his car. Skelton did not fight at all during 2011. After being released from prison, he did have two fights scheduled, first a rematch with Martin Rogan in Belfast, which never came off. Neither did a fight against unbeaten German Edmund Gerber.

In March 2012, Skelton pulled off a minor upset with a win over Tom Dallas, effectively ending Dallas's status as a prospect. Dallas struggled badly with Skelton's mauling style and at the end of round 4, Dallas was almost laid horizontal on the ropes as Skelton dropped blows on his head. A similar situation occurred in the following round, which led the referee to stop the fight. Another win followed in May against journeyman Ladislav Kovarik, who came in at very short notice. The fight was stopped in the third round.

Skelton fought again in October 2012 on the undercard of the David Price versus Audley Harrison fight, stopping Jakov Gospic in the second round, after Gospic had been cut by a clash of heads.

On 30 November 2012 Skelton challenged David Price for the British and Commonwealth heavyweight titles and lost via second-round KO.

Professional boxing

Professional kickboxing record

| style="text-align:center;" colspan="8"|63 Wins (57 knockouts, 0 submission, 6 decisions),  8 Losses, 0 Draws
|-
|align=center style="border-style: none none solid solid; background: #e3e3e3"|Res.
|align=center style="border-style: none none solid solid; background: #e3e3e3"|Record
|align=center style="border-style: none none solid solid; background: #e3e3e3"|Opponent
|align=center style="border-style: none none solid solid; background: #e3e3e3"|Type
|align=center style="border-style: none none solid solid; background: #e3e3e3"|Rd., Time
|align=center style="border-style: none none solid solid; background: #e3e3e3"|Date
|align=center style="border-style: none none solid solid; background: #e3e3e3"|Location
|align=center style="border-style: none none solid solid; background: #e3e3e3"|Notes
|-align=center
|Win
|63–8
|align=left| George Arias
|Decision
|3 
|2002-08-10
|align=left| 
|align=left|
|-align=center
|Win
|62–8
|align=left| Peter Varga
|TKO
|3 0:53
|2001-11-18
|align=left| Northampton, England
|align=left|
|-align=center
|Lose
|61–8
|align=left| Lloyd van Dams
|Decision
|1 
|2001-08-08
|align=left| Marine Messe, Fukuoka, Japan
|align=left|
|-align=center
|Lose
|61–7
|align=left| Ernesto Hoost
|Decision
|3 
|2001-06-16
|align=left| Vodafone Arena, Melbourne, Australia
|align=left|
|-align=center
|Win
|61–6
|align=left| Michael McDonald
|Decision
|3 
|2001-06-16
|align=left| Vodafone Arena, Melbourne, Australia
|align=left|
|-align=center
|Win
|60–6
|align=left| Paris Vasilikos
|KO
|2 1:51
|2001-06-16
|align=left| Vodafone Arena, Melbourne, Australia
|align=left|
|-align=center
|Win
|59–6
|align=left| Jeff Ford
|KO
|2 1:51
|2000-11-26
|align=left|  Northampton, England
|align=left|
|-align=center
|Lose
|58–6
|align=left| Francisco Filho
|KO
|2 2:36
|2000-08-20
|align=left| Yokohama Arena, Yokohama, Japan
|align=left|
|-align=center
|Win
|58–5
|align=left| Alexey Ignashov
|Decision
|3 
|2000-08-20
|align=left| Yokohama Arena, Yokohama, Japan
|align=left|
|-align=center
|Win
|57–5
|align=left| Ricky Nicholson
|KO
|3 1:10
|2000-04-16
|align=left| Aston Villa Leisure Center, Birmingham, England
|align=left|
|-align=center
|Win
|56–5
|align=left| Mark Russell
|Decision
|3 
|2000-04-16
|align=left| Aston Villa Leisure Center, Birmingham, England
|align=left|
|-align=center
|Win
|55–5
|align=left| Gary Turner
|Decision
|3 
|2000-04-16
|align=left| Aston Villa Leisure Center, Birmingham, England
|align=left|
|-align=center
|Loss
|54–5
|align=left| Jérôme Le Banner
|KO
|1 1:59
|1999-08-05
|align=left| Osaka Dome, Osaka, Japan
|align=left|
|-align=center
|Loss
|54–4
|align=left| Lloyd van Dams
|Decision
|3 
|1999-06-20
|align=left| Osaka Dome, Osaka, Japan
|align=left|
|-align=center
|Win
|54–3
|align=left| Jan Nortje
|Decision
|3 
|1999-06-20
|align=left| Osaka Dome, Osaka, Japan
|align=left|
|-align=center
|Loss
|53–3
|align=left| Peter Aerts
|KO
|4 3:00
|1999-04-25
|align=left| Yokohama Arena, Yokohama, Japan
|align=left|
|-align=center
|Loss
|53–2
|align=left| Sam Greco
|Decision
|5 
|1998-09-27
|align=left| Osaka Dome, Osaka, Japan
|align=left|
|-align=center
|Win
|53–1
|align=left| Masaaki Satake
|TKO
|1 2:06
|1998-07-18
|align=left| Nagoya Dome, Nagoya, Japan
|align=left|
|-align=center
|Win
|52–1
|align=left| Ray Sefo
|TKO
|2 3:00
|1998-05-24
|align=left| Marine Messe, Fukuoka, Japan
|align=left|
|-align=center
|Win
|51–1
|align=left| Jan Nortje
|TKO
|3 0:47
|1998-04-09
|align=left| Yokohama Arena, Yokohama, Japan
|align=left|
|-align=center

Mixed martial arts record

|-
| Loss
| align=center| 0–1
| Tom Erikson
| Submission (strangle choke)
| PRIDE 17
| 
| align=center| 1
| align=center| 1:51
| Tokyo, Japan
|

References

External links 

Matt Skelton profile at K-1

1967 births
English male boxers
English male kickboxers
English Muay Thai practitioners
English male mixed martial artists
Heavyweight boxers
Heavyweight kickboxers
Heavyweight mixed martial artists
Mixed martial artists utilizing boxing
Mixed martial artists utilizing Muay Thai
Living people
Sportspeople from Bedford
Prizefighter contestants
Black British sportsmen
European Boxing Union champions
English criminals
Commonwealth Boxing Council champions
British Boxing Board of Control champions